Fundamental is the second studio album by Puerto Rican progressive metal band Puya. Released in 1999, it is their first release on an international label (MCA).

Style
The musical style of Fundamental encompasses genres such as thrash metal, punk rock, salsa and jazz, as well as alternative rock and rap. The album has also been classified as progressive metal.

Track listing
All songs by Ramon Ortiz and Harold Hopkins Miranda. 
"Oasis" – 3:45
"Fake" – 4:08
"Fundamental" – 4:04
"Montate" – 3:46
"Whatever" – 4:06
"Retro" – 4:52
"Keep It Simple" – 5:00
"Sal Pa' Fuera" – 3:35
"Remora" – 2:04
"Trinidad" – 3:03
"Solo" – 5:02
"No Inventes" – 3:28

Bonus tracks
"Mire Niño" – 5:45
"Ventana" – 4:35
"Break It Up" (English version of "Sal Pa' Fuera") – 3:11
*The tracks "Mire Niño" and "Ventana" were available on some international releases of the album which featured slightly different track listings.

References

Notes

1999 albums
Progressive metal albums by Puerto Rican artists
Puya (band) albums